New Economic School (NES) (in Russia known as Российская экономическая школа, РЭШ – "Russian Economic School") is a  school of economics in Moscow, Russia.

Academic programs
 Bachelor of Arts in economics (BAE), joint program of NES and Higher School of Economics
 Master of Arts in Economics (MAE)

Economics of Energy and Natural Resources (Masters in Energy Economics, EE)
 Master of Arts in Energy Economics (MAEE) – applied magistrate (2 years)
 Master of Science in Energy Economics (MSEE) – professional retraining program (1 year)

Finance, investments, banks (MA / MSc in finance, MAF, MSF)
 Master of Arts in finance (MAF) – applied magistrate (2 years)
 Master of Science in finance (MSF) – professional retraining program (1 year)
 Masters in Finance, MiF
 Economics and Data Science

Alumni and students

Currently, 2390 economists have graduated from NES. Of those, 90% have a career in the private sector, mostly in international companies, investment banks, and consulting. Some 350 NES graduates continued their studies through to PhD programmes.

More than 80 PhDs work in the economics faculty in both US and UK universities: MIT, Princeton University, Stanford, Yale, the University of California, Berkeley, Columbia, UPenn, NYU, LSE, LBS and others, in the World Bank and the International Monetary Fund; 29 PhDs have come back to Russia.

Among the most prominent NES alumni are Arkady Dvorkovich, the FIDE President, Ksenia Yudaeva, Bank of Russia First Deputy Governor, Konstantin Sonin, professor at the University of Chicago Harris School of Public Policy, Oleg Itskhoki, the winner of the 2022 John Bates Clark Award, Alexander Gerko, the founder of XTX Markets.

More than 90% of NES professors have PhDs in economics and finance from the leading universities, such as Harvard, MIT, Columbia, NYU, LBS, Wisconsin-Madison, Northwestern University, and others. New Economic School is the first Russian university that has started hiring professors from abroad. Interviews with the candidates is held during an annual conference ASSA in Economics (AEA) and Finance (AFA).

These faculty members represent Russian economics in the global economics profession by participating in the international conferences and publishing in the leading international economics journals, including Econometrica, The American Economic Review, the Quarterly Journal of Economics, the Review of Economic Studies, the Journal of Economic Perspectives, the Journal of Economic Literature, the Journal of the European Economic Association, the Journal of Finance, the Journal of Business, and the American Political Science Review.

There are several research centres at NES: the Center for Demographic Research (CDR), which was created in 2011, and the Center for the Study of Diversity and Social Interactions (CSDSI), established in 2013 in cooperation with the head researcher, Professor Shlomo Weber, and the Center for Economic and Financial Research (CEFIR).

Rankings 
New Economic School is ranked:
the 1st place among Russian universities by the number of publications in leading international journals of economics and finance, according to the Tilburg University Ranking 
the 1st place among Russian universities by the number of citations per one scientific publication, according to QS Rankings
the 1st place among Institutions for Economic Studies in Russia, according to RePEc
2nd place in Russia, according to Shanghai Academic Ranking of World Universities (ARWU) in Economics Academic Subject

Campus
In 2014, NES moved to a new campus in Skolkovo, built for the purposes of academic life, and combining modern auditoria with sports and recreation facilities.

External links
 NES
 The Economist: "Russia’s economy is isolated from the global rout." Comments by NES rector Ruben Enikolopov
 The Moscow Times: "Market Volatility Exposes Investment Boom Fears." Comments by NES professor Oleg Shibanov
 FREE Policy Briefs: Ethnic Geography: Measurement and Evidence. Policy Brief by NES professor Michele Valsecchi and coauthors
 FREE Policy Briefs: Maternity capital program in Russia. Report by NES professor Natalya Volchkova
 FREE Policy Briefs: The Russian Food Embargo: Five Years Later. Column by NES professor Natalia Volchkova and coauthors

References

Economics schools
Educational institutions established in 1992
Universities and colleges in Moscow
1992 establishments in Russia